A liquid hydrogen tank-tainer  also known as a liquid hydrogen tank container is a specialized type of container designed to carry  cryogenic liquid hydrogen (LH2) on standard intermodal equipment. The tank is held within a box-shaped frame the same size and shape as a container.

Size and volume
Liquid hydrogen tanktainers are referenced by their size or volume capacity, generally an ISO  container.

See also

 Compressed hydrogen tube trailer
 Containerization
 Hydrogen economy
 Hydrogen infrastructure
 Liquid hydrogen tank car
 Liquid hydrogen trailer
 Tank chassis
 Tank container

References

External links
tank containers, by road, sea and rail

Hydrogen infrastructure
Industrial gases
Cryogenics